Cryomassage is a type of massage performed with liquid nitrogen or "cryo care" products. As a cryotherapy technique, cryomassage is said to reactivate the immune system, mobilize the endocrine system and neurohumoral system, improve health, and help to fight stress and fatigue.

In moderate doses, cold is said to be a cure for many diseases, including gastric ulcer and duodenal ulcer.

History
The fact that the use of cold in small doses can be beneficial for human health has been believed for thousands of years. The cold was used as a therapy in the Ancient Greece and Ancient Rome. The therapy is mentioned in the works of Hippocrates, Galen, Avicenna, and other physicians and scientists.

During wars, ice and snow were used as a medium of immediate relief for the wounded and helped to decrease the painful spasms of injured muscles by producing a numbing effect on nerves. Cold constricts local blood vessels, which results in a decrease in bleeding and swelling.

Methodology
General cryomassage is performed with one or two ice packs or cryocare packs. General cryomassage is said to initiate tissue regeneration and reparation process, improve muscular blood circulation, eliminate metabolic waste and hypoxia. Cold numbs nerves and eases pain, and is said to produce anesthetic, homeostatic, and anti-inflammatory effects upon the patient. 

In cosmetology, cryomassage is performed with liquid nitrogen.

See also
 Cup massage
 Vibromassage
 Hydro massage
 Honey massage
 Cryotherapy

References

C|